Lite FM may refer to:

 Lite FM (New Zealand) a former radio station in Christchurch, New Zealand
 Lite FM (Sweden)
 Lite (radio station), a radio station in Malaysia
 Lite 89.2, a Sri Lankan radio station
 Connect Radio 106.8, formerly 106.8 Lite FM, a radio station in Peterborough, United Kingdom
 Most Radio 105.8 FM, formerly Lite FM 105.8, a radio station in Jakarta, Indonesia
 WLTW 106.7 FM, a radio station based in New York City, United States